Klemtu is an unincorporated community on Swindle Island in the coastal fjords of British Columbia, Canada.  It is located on Kitasoo Indian Reserve No. 1.

It is adjacent to the Fiordland Conservancy. These two tribes live together as, and are jointly governed by, the Kitasoo/Xai'xais Nation. Traditional languages spoken at Klemtu are the southern dialect of the Tsimshian language, called Southern Tsimshian, and Xaixais, a dialect of the Heiltsuk language. In religious affiliation, the community is dominated by the United Church of Canada.

The government of the Kitasoo/Xai'xais Nation is a member government of the Oweekeno-Kitasoo-Nuxalk Tribal Council.

The population of Klemtu in 1983 was 269.  the population of Klemtu was 505.

Name origin

An alternate older name for Klemtu is Kitasoo.  it was also known as China Hat due to the shape of Cone Island, which protects it from the open water.  The name Klemtu is from the Coast Tsimshian language "Klemdoo-oolk," meaning "impassable".

See also
List of canneries in British Columbia
List of Indian reserves in British Columbia

References

External links
 The Kitasoo/Xai'Xais Nation
 An Introduction to Klemtu
   Klemtu - on the Inside Passage to Alaska

Bibliography

Inglis, Gordon B., et al. (1990) "Tsimshians of British Columbia since 1900."  In Handbook of North American Indians, Volume 7: Northwest Coast, pp. 285–293.  Washington: Smithsonian Institution.
Miller, Jay (1981) "Moieties and Cultural Amnesia: Manipulation of Knowledge in a Pacific Northwest Coast Native Community," Arctic Anthropology, vol. 18, no. 1, pp. 23–32.
Miller, Jay (1982) "Tsimshian Moieties and Other Clarifications," Northwest Anthropological Research Notes, vol. 16, no. 2, pp. 148–164.

Populated places on the British Columbia Coast
Unincorporated settlements in British Columbia
Tsimshian
Heiltsuk
North Coast of British Columbia
Central Coast of British Columbia